The São Toméan] ambassador in Washington, D.C. is the official representative of the Government in São Tomé to the Government of the United States.

List of representatives 

São Tomé and Príncipe–United States relations

References 

 
United States
São Tomé and Príncipe